This is a list of colleges and universities in Idaho. This list also includes other educational institutions providing higher education, meaning tertiary, quaternary, and, in some cases, post-secondary education.

Open institutions
The Idaho State Board of Education oversees three comprehensive universities. The University of Idaho in Moscow was the first university in the state (founded in 1889). It opened its doors in 1892 and is the land-grant institution and primary research university of the state. Idaho State University in Pocatello opened in 1901 as the Academy of Idaho, attained four-year status in 1947 and university status in 1963. Boise State University is the most recent school to attain university status in Idaho. The school opened in 1932 as Boise Junior College and became Boise State University in 1974. Lewis–Clark State College in Lewiston is the only public, non-university 4-year college in Idaho. It opened as a normal school in 1893.

Idaho has four regional community colleges: North Idaho College in Coeur d'Alene; College of Southern Idaho in Twin Falls; College of Western Idaho in Nampa, which opened in 2009, College of Eastern Idaho in Idaho Falls, which transitioned from a technical college in 2017.

Private institutions in Idaho are Boise Bible College, affiliated with congregations of the Christian churches and churches of Christ; Brigham Young University–Idaho in Rexburg, which is affiliated with the Church of Jesus Christ of Latter-day Saints and a sister college to Brigham Young University; The College of Idaho in Caldwell, which still maintains a loose affiliation with the Presbyterian Church; Northwest Nazarene University in Nampa; and New Saint Andrews College in Moscow, of reformed Christian theological background. McCall College is a non-affiliated 2-year private college in McCall, which was founded in 2011 and later opened in 2013.

Defunct institutions
Four now-defunct institutions were located in Idaho:

See also 

 List of college athletic programs in Idaho
 Higher education in the United States
 Lists of American institutions of higher education
 List of recognized higher education accreditation organizations
 Lists of universities and colleges
 Lists of universities and colleges by country

References

External links 
Department of Education listing of accredited institutions in Idaho

 
Idaho, List of colleges and universities in
Universities and colleges